The North Bougainville or West Bougainville languages are a small language family spoken on the island of Bougainville in Papua New Guinea. They were classified as East Papuan languages by Stephen Wurm, but this does not now seem tenable, and was abandoned in Ethnologue (2009).

The family includes the closely related Rotokas and Eivo (Askopan) languages, together with two languages that are more distantly related:

Spoken languages
 Keriaka (Ramopa)
 Konua (Rapoisi)
 Rotokas branch
 Rotokas
 Askopan

There are about 9,000 speakers combined for all four North Bougainville languages.

See also
Papuan languages
East Papuan languages
South Bougainville languages

References

Structural Phylogenetics and the Reconstruction of Ancient Language History. Michael Dunn, Angela Terrill, Ger Reesink, Robert A. Foley, Stephen C. Levinson. Science magazine, 23 Sept. 2005, vol. 309, p 2072.
 Malcolm Ross (2005). "Pronouns as a preliminary diagnostic for grouping Papuan languages." In: Andrew Pawley, Robert Attenborough, Robin Hide and Jack Golson, eds, Papuan pasts: cultural, linguistic and biological histories of Papuan-speaking peoples, 15-66. Canberra: Pacific Linguistics.

 
Language families
East Papuan languages
Languages of the Autonomous Region of Bougainville